Magnum is a Latin word meaning "great".

Magnum may also refer to:

Businesses and organizations
 Magnum Research, a firearms maker
 Magnum Semiconductor, a spin-off of Cirrus Logic
 Magnum Photos, a photojournalist cooperative
 Magnum Corporation, a Malaysian gaming company

Art and entertainment

Music
 Jeff Magnum, former bassist of the Dead Boys
 Magnum (band), English rock band
 Magnum (musician) (born 1973), stage name of Sami Wolking
 Magnum Force (album), the second album from hip hop duo Heltah Skeltah

Other uses in arts and entertainment
 Magnum, a fictional characters and commander of the Autobots
 Magnum, a member of the Elementals in Marvel Comics
Magnum, P.I., a 1980s American crime drama television series
 Thomas Magnum, the lead character
Magnum P.I. (2018 TV series), its reboot
 Magnum Force, the 2nd of five Dirty Harry movies, starring Clint Eastwood as San Francisco policeman, Harry Callahan. The title refers to Harry's use of a .44 Magnum gun.
 Magnum T. A. (born 1959), ring name of professional wrestler Terry Wayne Allen
 Magnum XL-200, a roller coaster at Cedar Point
 Moses Magnum, a Marvel Comics villain

In science and technology

Vehicles
 Chevrolet Optra Magnum, a car
 Chrysler LA engine, line
 Dodge Magnum, a car
 Dynamic Sport Magnum, a Polish paraglider design
 Mitsubishi Magnum, a pickup truck
 MV Magnum, a 1979 Cambodian cargo ship
 O'Neill Magnum, also known as Magnum Jake and Magnum Pickup, an airplane
 Rayton-Fissore Magnum, an Italian luxury off-roader
 TES 28 Magnam, a Polish sailboat design
 Renault Magnum, a truck
 Vauxhall Magnum, a car
 Yakovlev Yak-30 (1960), a Soviet military trainer aircraft

Other uses in science and technology
 Os magnum or capitate bone, the largest of the carpal bones in the human hand
 Magnum (rocket), a rocket designed by NASA during the 1990s
 Magnum (satellite), a class of U.S. reconnaissance satellite
 Foramen magnum, a large opening in the occipital bone of the cranium
 Magnum cartridge, a type of firearms cartridge
 MIPS Magnum, a type of computer workstation
 Multicolor Active Galactic Nuclei Monitoring, a telescope in Hawaii

Other products
 Magnum (condom), a brand of condom manufactured by Trojan
 Magnum (ice cream), a brand of ice cream owned by Unilever
 Magnum (unit), a 1.5-litre bottle for wine and champagne
 Magnum, a 1.5-litre size of wine bottle
 Magnum hops, used in the brewing of beer
 Sharpie (marker) Magnum, a large permanent marker
 Magnum engine, a line of Chrysler internal combustion engines
 Magnum, a series of pistol ammunition types

People
 H Magnum, French rapper originating from the Ivory Coast
 Dave Magnum (born 1962), former political candidate in Wisconsin
 Magnum Membrere (born 1982), Filipino basketball player
 Magnum (footballer) (born 1982), Magnum Rafael Farias Tavares, Brazilian football attacking midfielder
 Magnum Rolle (born 1986), Bahamian basketball player
 Magnum Tokyo (born 1973), Japanese professional wrestler
 Willie Person Magnum (1792-1861), American politician
 Zhang Weili, nickname Magnum, Chinese mixed martial artist

Other uses
 Magnum, NATO code for an AGM-88 or anti-radiation missile launch
 "Magnum opus", a work or art considered the greatest work of a person's career or a work of outstanding skill
 Magnum opus (alchemy), the creation of the philosopher's stone

See also
 O magnum mysterium, a Christian liturgical chant
 Magna (disambiguation)
 Magnus (disambiguation)
 Magnum opus (disambiguation)